The Clarence Anderson Barn is a historic barn on the north side of Arkansas Highway 66 in the hamlet of Newnata, Arkansas.  It is a two-story wood-frame structure, with vertical board siding and enclosed sheds on the side.  The interior is organized in a transverse crib manner.  Built in 1925, the building is distinctive for the pair of gable-roof dormers placed near the ridge line; this sort of feature is not usually found on barns in the region.

The barn was listed on the National Register of Historic Places in 1985.

See also
National Register of Historic Places listings in Stone County, Arkansas

References

Barns on the National Register of Historic Places in Arkansas
Buildings and structures completed in 1925
Buildings and structures in Stone County, Arkansas
National Register of Historic Places in Stone County, Arkansas